William Bentham (birth unknown – death unknown) was an English professional rugby league footballer who played in the 1910s and 1920s.

International honours
Billy Bentham won caps for England while at Broughton Rangers in 1922 against Wales, in 1926 against Wales, and won caps for Great Britain while at Broughton Rangers in 1924 against New Zealand (2 matches).

References

External links

Broughton Rangers players
England national rugby league team players
English rugby league players
Great Britain national rugby league team players
Lancashire rugby league team players
Place of birth missing
Place of death missing
Rugby league wingers
Year of birth missing
Year of death missing